D411 branches off to the south from D8 in Makarska towards Makarska ferry port - ferry access to Sumartin on Brač Island.

The road, as well as all other state roads in Croatia, is managed and maintained by Hrvatske ceste, state owned company.

Traffic volume 

Traffic is not regularly counted on the road, however, Hrvatske ceste report number of vehicles using Makarska-Sumartin ferry line, connecting D411 to the D113 state road. Furthermore the D411 road carries considerable local traffic in Makarska itself, which does not use the ferry at all, greatly exceeding the ferried traffic. Substantial variations between annual (AADT) and summer (ASDT) traffic volumes are attributed to the fact that the road connects to a number of summer resorts.

Road junctions and populated areas

Sources

State roads in Croatia
Transport in Split-Dalmatia County